Afroedura otjihipa, also known as Otjihipa flat gecko,  is a species of African geckos, first found in Namibia.

References

Afroedura
Reptiles of Namibia
Endemic fauna of Namibia
Reptiles described in 2022